The 1997 college football season may refer to:

 1997 NCAA Division I-A football season
 1997 NCAA Division I-AA football season
 1997 NCAA Division II football season
 1997 NCAA Division III football season
 1997 NAIA football season